Chandra Shekhar Azad University of Agriculture & Technology (CSAUA&T) is an agricultural university at Kanpur in the Indian state of Uttar Pradesh. It is named after the Indian revolutionary Chandrashekhar Azad. Besides Kanpur, it also has constituent colleges (also known as campuses) in Etawah and Lakhimpur Kheri district who are fully functional and an upcoming in Hardoi. The university caters to the needs of the farming community of 29 districts of Uttar Pradesh.

History

A small school was started in 1893 at Kanpur to provide training to revenue officers. It gradually grew to the status of a Government Agricultural College (1906), the U.P. Institute of Agricultural Sciences (1969) and a full-fledged university in 1975. U.P. College of Veterinary Science & Animal Husbandry, Mathura was merged with the university at that time.

Colleges
The university comprises eight colleges: (in Kanpur) College of Agriculture, College of Home Science, College of Forestry, College of Horticulture, (in Etawah) Dr.BRA College of Agricultural Engineering and Technology, College of Dairy Technology, College of Fisheries and another (in Lakhimpur Kheri district) College of Agriculture.

Admission policy  
Students are admitted to the undergraduate programme through UPCATET (Uttar Pradesh Combined Agriculture & Technology Entrance Test) conducted by Agriculture Universities one by one of UP, Govt. of Uttar Pradesh. Seats are allotted according to the merit of the students in UPCATET and their choice at the time of counselling 2008-09 onward students are taken through UPCATET, Now this year for 2020-21 session this Entrance exam is conducted by CSAUA&T, Kanpur.

Courses 
Bachelor of Science in Agriculture

Bachelor of Science in Horticulture

Bachelor of Science in Forestry

Bachelor of Science in Community Science (H.Sc.)

Bachelor of Fisheries Science

Bachelor of Technology in Agricultural Engineering

Master of Science in Agriculture

Master of Science in Horticulture

Master of Science in Home Science

Master of Business Administration (MBA-ABM)

Doctor of Philosophy in Agriculture Sciences
B.Tech in Computer science

Research

The extensive research effort in the university takes place under director of the Agricultural Research Station. It is divided into the following research sections:
 Economic Botanist (Rabi Cereals) established in 1904 as the first Economic Botanist of India (along with Lyallpur, now in Pakistan).
 Barley Section
 Economic Botanist (Legumes)
 Economic Botanist (Oilseed)

The university has developed and released more than 150 early maturing, high yielding, and disease/insect resistant crop varieties/hybrids of cereals, pulses, oilseeds, vegetables, cotton, 29 of these in the last three years. It has contributed to the evolution of agro-techniques suited individual situations.

Extension

The university provides training to farmers and officials in agricultural technologies. An Agricultural Technology Information Centre at the main gate provides information to the farmers in the region.

Notable alumni
 Kishan Singh, plant pathologist and Shanti Swarup Bhatnagar Prize recipient
 Hargovind Bhargava, MLA

References

External links
 Chandra Shekhar Azad University of Agriculture & Technology website

 
Agricultural universities and colleges in Uttar Pradesh
Universities and colleges in Kanpur
Universities in Uttar Pradesh
Memorials to Chandra Shekhar Azad
1975 establishments in Uttar Pradesh
Educational institutions established in 1975